The Hyūga Nada is the part of the Pacific Ocean that lies off the eastern shore of the island of Kyushu, to the south-west of the island of Honshu, off the south coast of Japan. Its name is derived from the former province of Hyūga, which corresponded to the prefecture of Miyazaki before the Meiji Restoration. Also, earthquakes occur repeatedly in Hyuga Nada (For example, 1968 Hyuga-nada earthquake).

References

See also 

Seas of Japan

 Hyūga Province
 1968 Hyuga-nada earthquake